The weasel sportive lemur (Lepilemur mustelinus), also known as the greater sportive lemur, weasel lemur, or greater weasel lemur, is a species of lemur native to northeastern Madagascar. Its habitat includes rainforests and tropical rainforests. Its dorsal side is a reddish-brown colour, and greyish brown ventrally. Its colour darkens towards the tip of its tail. Individuals weigh from  It has long, soft fur.

The weasel sportive lemur is predominantly a leaf-eater, although it supplements its diet with fruits and flowers. It is an arboreal species, and travels through the trees by leaping. As with other leaping primates, it has stereoscopic vision that enables it to determine distances precisely. Groups consist solely of a mother and its offspring; the males are solitary, and are very territorial. Like some other lemurs, they are nocturnal.

References

 

Sportive lemurs
Endemic fauna of Madagascar
Mammals of Madagascar
Mammals described in 1851
Taxa named by Isidore Geoffroy Saint-Hilaire